TILE-Gx is a VLIW ISA multicore processor family by Tilera.  It consists of a mesh network of up to 100 cores. It is to be produced by TSMC with 40 nm. It was announced on February 19, 2013 that Tilera would produce a 72-core Tile-Gx CPU capable of processing high-bandwidth networks.

64-bit core (3-issue)
32 KB L1 I-cache, 32 KB L1 D-cache (per core)
256 KB L2 cache (per core)
up to 26 MB L3 cache (per chip)
 4 MAC/cycle with SIMD extensions
 2 or 4 ECC 72-bit DDR3 memory controllers (up to 2.1 GHz)
 Built-in crypto accelerator with 40 Gbit/s encryption (small packet) and 20 Gbit/s full-duplex compression, true random number generator, RSA accelerator

As of June 2018, the Linux kernel has dropped support for this architecture.

See also 
 TILE64
 TILEPro64

References
 

Manycore processors
Very long instruction word computing